Salamone is a surname. Notable people with the surname include:

 Alexi Salamone (born 1987), ice sledge hockey player 
 Antonio Salamone (1918–1998), member of the Sicilian Mafia 
 Francisco Salamone (1897–1959), Argentine architect
 Salamone Rossi (ca. 1570–1630), Italian Jewish violinist 
 Salvatore Salamone, scientist and researcher
 Thomas C. Salamone (1927–2014), American politician

See also
 Salamon, surname

Italian-language surnames